The 1961 Albanian National Championship was the 24th season of the Albanian National Championship, the top professional league for association football clubs, since its establishment in 1930.

Overview
It was contested by 10 teams, and Partizani won the championship.

League standings

Results

Final

Replay 

Note: '17 Nëntori' is SK Tirana, 'Labinoti' is KS Elbasani, 'Traktori' is KS Lushnja

References
Albania - List of final tables (RSSSF)

Kategoria Superiore seasons
1
Albania
Albania